The 2008 Russian Super Cup was the 6th Russian Super Cup match, a football match which was contested between the 2007 Russian Premier League champion, Zenit Saint Petersburg, and the winner of 2006–07 Russian Cup, Lokomotiv Moscow. The match was held on 9 March 2008 at the Luzhniki Stadium in Moscow, Russia. Zenit St. Petersburg beat Lokomotiv Moscow 2–1 to win their first Russian Super Cup.

Match details

See also
2008 in Russian football
2007 Russian Premier League
2006–07 Russian Cup

External links
 Official stats

Super Cup
Russian Super Cup
Russian Super Cup
Russian Super Cup
March 2008 sports events in Europe
2008 in Moscow
Sports competitions in Moscow